Begoro is a town and the capital of Fanteakwa district, a district in the Eastern Region of south Ghana. Begoro has a settlement population of 48,516 people, in 2013.

Geography
Begoro is about 150 km north of Accra, off the road joining Koforidua and Nkawkaw.

Festival
Odwira festival also known as Ahwie.

Twin towns and cities
List of sister cities of Fanteakwa, designated by Sister Cities International:

 Fanteakwa is linked with York, England, via the York Fanteakwa Community Link (YFCL).

References

External links
Map of Begoro
 

	

Populated places in the Eastern Region (Ghana)